Dyuny railway station is a railway station located near Sestroretsk (suburb of Saint Petersburg), Russia.

It was built by the Joint-stock company of the Prinorskaya St.-Peterburg-Sestroretsk railway.

References 

Была такая станция. В газете Здравница Санкт-Петербурга № 32(294) 28 ноября 2012 года, с. 4

Railway stations in Saint Petersburg